Dendrobium boosii, or Ronny Boos' dendrobium, is a species of plant in the family Orchidaceae endemic to the Philippines.

Description
Growth habit: epiphytic; sympodial; pendent.

Inflorescences: single flowered; appearing from nodes of the leafless stems.

Flower colour: Sepals and petals are pinkish-white to pale pink with five to seven pinkish-red stripes basally; labellum is pink, yellow and orange. It is the smallest-flowered member of the section Calcarifera from the Philippines.

Taxonomy
W. Suarez and Jim Cootes named this species in 2011, in the Australian Orchid Review. Named for Ronny Boos, from Tacloban City in Leyte. He has contributed much knowledge of the orchids of Samar and Leyte.

Distribution and habitat

References

boosii
Endemic orchids of the Philippines
Flora of the Visayas
Plants described in 2011